Podemos Region of Murcia is a branch of Podemos in the Region of Murcia, Spain.

In July 2014, the fourth assembly of the Murcian branch was held, with the objective of joining all the Podemos groups of the region into the party. After primaries process ended on 14 February 2015, the first Citizen Regional Council was elected. Óscar Urralburu Arza was elected the secretary general.

In the 2015 Murcian parliamentary election, Murcia Podemos won six seats, forming a parliamentary group in Regional Assembly of Murcia.

For the first time, no party has an absolute majority  and the People's Party (Spain) now depend on Citizens (Spanish political party) to form a government despite a prior agreement with Podemos and other parties in which C's agreed not to support the PP.

Electoral performance

Regional Assembly of Murcia

Cortes Generales

 * Within Unidos Podemos.

European Parliament

 *Within Unidas Podemos Cambiar Europa.

Symbols

References

External links

Official website of Podemos

Political parties in the Region of Murcia
Murcia